David Bradley (born Bradley Simpson in Texas, October 2, 1951) is an American actor and martial artist, known for starring in numerous low-budget action movies beginning in the late 1980s. His best-known films are the American Ninja sequels, and the Cyborg Cop films.

Career
Bradley is known for his role as Sean Davidson in American Ninja 3: Blood Hunt and American Ninja 4: The Annihilation. He also stars in a separate film titled, American Ninja V, as Joe Kastle, which is not technically a sequel to the previous American Ninja films, but a different movie altogether. Previous to making films, Bradley worked as a car salesman on Wilshire Boulevard. He attended the screening of American Ninja 3: Blood Hunt in Los Angeles, and director Cedric Sundstrom claimed that he in Bradley found a good balance between vulnerability and physical aspects. According to Sundstrom, Bradley always resented the fact that his character got rescued by Michael Dudikoff's character in the film American Ninja 4: The Annihilation.

Personal life
Bradley is trained in Shotokan Karate (black belt), Taekwondo (4th Dan black belt), Kung Fu, Aikido and weapons.

Filmography

References

External links

1953 births
Living people
American male film actors
American martial artists
Male actors from Texas
Shotokan practitioners
American male karateka
American male taekwondo practitioners
American aikidoka
American wushu practitioners